Sailing at the 2015 Pacific Games was held at Port Moresby from 5–11 July 2015. The regatta was hosted by Royal Papua Yacht Club in Konedobu, with men's, women's and team events taking place on the Konebada course. Equipment classes were the Laser and Laser Radial dinghies, and the Hobie 16 catamaran.

Sailors from Australia and New Zealand were invited to compete at the Pacific games for the first time.

Medal summary

Medal table

Results

See also
 Sailing at the Pacific Games

References

2015 Pacific Games
Pacific Games
2015
Sailing competitions in Papua New Guinea